For related information, see the articles on History of RNA Biology, History of Molecular Biology, and History of Genetics.

RNA b
RNA
RNA